HERV-R_7q21.2 provirus ancestral envelope (Env) polyprotein is a protein that in humans is encoded by the ERV3 gene.

Function 

The human genome includes many retroelements including the human endogenous retroviruses (HERVs), which compose about 7-8% of the human genome. ERV3, one of the most studied HERVs, is thought to have integrated 30 to 40 million years ago and is present in higher primates with the exception of gorillas. Taken together, the observation of genome conservation, the detection of transcript expression, and the presence of conserved ORFs is circumstantial evidence for a functional role. Similar endogenous retroviral Env genes like syncytin-1 have important roles in placental formation and embryonic development by enabling cell-cell fusion. Despite its origin as an Env gene, ERV3 has a premature stop codon that precludes any cell-cell fusion functionality. However, it does have an immunosuppressive function that helps the fetus evade a damaging maternal immune response, which may explain its high expression in the placenta.

There is speculation that ERV3 originally did have cell-cell fusion functionality in the placenta, but that it was eventually supplanted by other Env genes like syncytin, leading to a loss of this function. 

Another functional role is  suggested by the observation that downregulation of ERV3 is reported in choriocarcinoma.

References

Further reading

External links 
 

Transcription factors